HMS M21  was a First World War Royal Navy M15-class monitor. After service in the Mediterranean and the Dover Patrol, she struck a mine off Ostend in January 1918 and sank off Dover.

Design
Intended as a shore bombardment vessel, M21s primary armament was a single 9.2 inch Mk VI gun removed from the  HMS Theseus. In addition to her 9.2 inch gun, she also possessed one 12 pounder and one six pound anti-aircraft gun. Due to the shortage of Bolinder diesel engines that equipped her sisters, she was fitted with 2 shaft triple expansion steam engines that allowed a top speed of eleven knots. The monitor's crew consisted of sixty nine officers and men.

Construction
HMS M21 ordered in March, 1915, as part of the War Emergency Programme of ship construction. She was laid down at the Sir Raylton Dixon & Co. Ltd shipyard at Govan in March 1915, launched on 27 May 1915, and completed in July 1915.

World War I
M21 served initially in the Mediterranean from September 1915. On her return from the Mediterranean in September 1917, M21 had her main 9.2in gun removed, as it was required for artillery use on the Western Front, and a BL  Mk III 50-caliber gun was fitted in lieu.

M21 then served with the Dover Patrol from October 1917.

Loss
M21 struck a mine off Ostend on 20 October 1918.  She was taken in tow to Dover, but sank off West Pier.

References

Dittmar, F. J. & Colledge, J. J., "British Warships 1914-1919", (Ian Allan, London, 1972), 

 

M15-class monitors
1915 ships
World War I monitors of the United Kingdom
Ships sunk by mines
Maritime incidents in 1918
World War I shipwrecks in the English Channel
Royal Navy ship names